Alexander Sladkovsky (born 20 October 1965, Taganrog, Russia) is a Russian conductor. He is the Chief conductor and Artistic director of the Tatarstan National Symphony Orchestra, People's Artist of Russia, People's Artist of Tatarstan, winner of the III International Prokofiev Competition (1999).

Biography
Alexander Sladkovsky was born in 1965 in a Russian city of Taganrog. He graduated from Moscow Conservatory with a gold medal and Saint Petersburg Conservatory.
In 2001, he conducted in a concert at the Hermitage Theater in honor of the visit of Her Majesty Queen Beatrix of the Netherlands. He assisted Mariss Jansons and Mstislav Rostropovich. 
Maestro Sladkovsky was the Сhief conductor of the State Opera and Ballet Theater of the St. Petersburg Conservatory, subsequently held the positions of the Сhief conductor of the Saint Petersburg State Chapel (2004–2006), and the conductor of the New Russia State Symphony Orchestra (2006–2010). 

Since 2010 Alexander Sladkovsky is Artistic Director and Chief Conductor of the Tatarstan National Symphony Orchestra in the city of Kazan (Tatarstan, Russia).
The orchestra entered a new phase when Maestro Sladkovsky came. Currently the Orchestra from Tatarstan is considered one of the best symphony orchestras in Russia. Organized by the TNSO and Alexander Sladkovsky international music festivals such as Rakhlin Seasons, Miras, White Lilac, Kazan Autumn, Concordia, Denis Matsuev Meets Friends, International Organ festival and Creative Discovery are considered ones of the most prominent events in cultural life of Tatarstan and Russia. Alexander Sladkovsky and TNSO run the project “Property of the Republic” for talented pupils from music schools and conservatory students; the educational project for Kazan schools pupils “Music lessons with an orchestra” and the project “Healing through music” for seriously ill children.
Alexander Sladkovsky is the founder of the Youth Symphony Orchestra of Republic of Tatarstan. 

The TNSO under the direction of Alexander Sladkovsky is the first Russian regional orchestra recorded by Medici.tv and Mezzo channels. In 2014, the TNSO conducted by Alexander Sladkovsky performed at the La Folle Journée festival in Japan. In 2016, for the first time in the orchestra’s history, it gave concerts during a European tour in the Brucknerhaus (Linz) and in the Golden Hall of Musikverein (Vienna). In December 2018, the TNSO and Maestro Alexander Sladkovsky made the first tour in China, and in 2019, the TNSO conducted by Alexander Sladkovsky performed at the La Folle Journée festival in France and Japan as well as La Roque d'Antheron Festival. Alexander Sladkovsky and Tatarstan National Symphony Orchestra had concert tours in Turkey (2015), Slovakia (2016), Switzerland (2016, 2017), Germany (2016), Spain (2017, 2020), Dubai (2022), Oman (2022).
In 2016 in cooperation with the Melodiya record label several global musical projects were realized: the recording of three symphonies of G. Mahler (Nos. 1, 5, 9) and all symphonies and concertos of D. Shostakovich. In May 2020, the digital release of the “Tchaikovsky-2020” box set took place — a recording of all symphonies and instrumental concerts of P. Tchaikovsky on the Sony Classical label. In August 2020, the TNSO under the direction of Alexander Sladkovsky recorded symphonic works by S. Rachmaninoff on the Sony Classical label. March 2021 concert-presentations of the box set “Sergey Rachmaninoff. Symphony Collection” were held in Moscow, St. Petersburg, and Kazan. In July 2021, all of L. van Beethoven's symphonies and music of I. Stravinsky's ballets were recorded. 

In 2019, Alexander Sladkovsky was awarded the Sergei Rachmaninoff International Award in the nomination “Special Project in the Name of Sergei Rachmaninoff” for special attention to his legacy and organizing the Sergei Rachmaninoff International Festival “White Lilac” in Kazan. 
On September 1, 2021, by order of the rector of the N. Zhiganov Kazan State Conservatory artistic director and chief conductor of the TNSO Alexander Sladkovsky was appointed professor of the Department of Opera and Symphony Conducting at the N. Zhiganov Kazan State Conservatory.

In 2022, Alexander Sladkovsky became the first winner of the 440-Hertz Grand Orchestra Award in the Conductor nomination.

The Tatarstan National Symphony Orchestra under the direction of Alexander Sladkovsky is currently the first and only regional orchestra that has been honored to have its own annual subscription in the Moscow State Philharmonic Society.

Discography

- Anthology of Tatarstan composers' music (Release year: 2012)

- «Просветление» (Enlightenment) (Release year: 2013)

- Mahler. Symphonies №№1, 5, 9 (Release year: 2016)

- Alexander Sladkovsky. Shostakovich: Complete concertos (Release year: 2017)

- Alexander Sladkovsky. Shostakovich: Complete symphonies (Release year: 2017)

- Tchaikovsky 2020 (Release year: 2020)

- Sergey Rachmaninoff. Symphony Collection (Release year: 2021)

- «Stravinsky. Ballet essentials» (Release year: 2022)

References

1. Seen and Heard International. Alexander Sladkovsky, TNSO and Albina Shagimuratova in Moscow. March 6, 2022 

2. Le Devoir. Alexander Sladkovski, un trésor musical planétaire

3. Seen and Heard International.Sladkovsky unleashes the Tenth International Festival ‘Rakhlin Seasons’ with a superb ‘Eroica’ Symphony

4. Musicweb International. Sergey Rachmaninoff Symphony Collection. Alexander Sladkovsky 

5. Seen and Heard International. Sladkovsky’s Beethoven opens the Fifty-Fifth Concert Season in Kazan

6. Musicweb International. Tchaikovsky 2020. Alexander Sladkovsky

7. Codalario. CRÍTICA: VADIM REPIN CON LA SINFÓNICA NACIONAL DE TARTARISTÁN EN EL CICLO GOLDBERG 

8. Marvellous La Roque d'Antheron Festival. TNSO and Alexander Sladkovsky

9. Seen and Heard International. Rakhlin's Seasons 2019. TNSO and Alexander Sladkovsky

10. Seen and Heard International. Sladkovsky Conducts the TNSO in Diverse Repertoire at La Folle Journée de Nantes 2019

11. Seen and Heard International. Mahler’s ‘Symphony of a Thousand’ is Premiered in Kazan

12. Best of 2018: Classical CDs. From the year's favourites: a Kazan Shostakovich. TNSO and Alexander Sladkovsky 

13. Musicweb International. Shostakovich collection. TNSO and Alexander Sladkovsky

Living people
21st-century Russian conductors (music)
Russian male conductors (music)
21st-century Russian male musicians
1965 births